England Roller Derby represents England in women's international roller derby, at events such as the Roller Derby World Cup.  The team was first formed to compete at the 2011 Roller Derby World Cup in Toronto, Canada, and competed in the 2014 Roller Derby World Cup in Dallas, USA and the 2018 Roller Derby World Cup in Manchester, UK.

Results

2011
Finished the tournament in third place, losing by 161 points to 90 to Team Canada in the semifinal, but beating Team Australia by 203 points to 85 in the third-place playoff. Before the event, The Guardian noted that the team was one of the three favourites, with Canada and Team USA, to reach the final.

2014 
Finished the tournament in second place, losing by 291 points to 105 to Team USA in the final.

2018 
Finished the tournament in fourth place, losing by 173 points to 147 points to Team Canada in the semifinal.

Lineups

2011 team roster
Six tryout sessions were organised for prospective skaters, and this enabled the coaches to draw up a shortlist of forty.  They were invited to attend a final tryout, from which the final roster of twenty was selected. The final line-up was announced in August 2011; more than half the skaters selected for the team were from the London Rollergirls.
(league affiliations listed as of at the time of the announcement)

2011 coaching staff
Ballistic Whistle, London Rollergirls
Barry Fight, Central City Rollergirls
Rollin' Stoner, Royal Windsor Rollergirls

2014 team roster

Initial tryout sessions for the Team England training squad 2014 were held in both Manchester and London. Prospective skaters were also invited to submit video tryouts if unable to attend the initial sessions. Shortlisted individuals were then invited to a second tryout session in Birmingham from which the final training squad would be selected. The final training squad line-up was announced in January 2014.

2014 coaching staff
Ballistic Whistle, London Rollergirls
Stefanie Mainey, London Rollergirls
Rollin' Stoner, Royal Windsor Rollergirls

2018 team roster 
Initial tryout sessions for the England Roller Derby training squad 2018 were held in both Oldham and Haywards Heath in August 2016. Prospective skaters were also invited to submit video tryouts if unable to attend the initial sessions. Shortlisted individuals were then invited to a second tryout session in Birmingham  in October 2016 from which the final training squad would be selected. The final training squad line-up was announced in October 2016. The final roster for the tournament was announced in December 2017 (indicated below with *).

2018 coaching staff

Tomi "Illbilly" Lang, Southern Discomfort
Shane Aisbett, Southern Discomfort

References

England
Roller derby
Roller derby in England
2011 establishments in England
Sports clubs established in 2011